Nebria laticollis angulata is a subspecies of beetle in the family Carabidae found in China, North Korea, and Russia.

References

Beetles described in 1949
Beetles of Asia